2005 Australian Riots may refer to:
 2005 Cronulla riots
 2005 Macquarie Fields riots